Alisse Robertson (born 7 January 1978) is a former association football player who represented New Zealand at international level.

Robertson made a single appearance for Football Ferns in a 0–5 loss to United States on 4 June 2000.

References

1978 births
Living people
New Zealand women's international footballers
New Zealand women's association footballers
Women's association footballers not categorized by position